Bob Bryan and Mike Bryan were the defending champions, but lost to Daniel Nestor and Nenad Zimonjić in the final, 4–6, 2–6.

Seeds

Draw

Finals

Top half

Bottom half

References 
 Main Draw

Men's Doubles